Public Holidays in India, also known as Statutory Holidays, or colloquially Government Holidays, consist of a variety of cultural, nationalistic, and religious holidays that are legislated in India at the union or state levels. While many of these holidays are honored and acknowledged nationwide, state legislation varies regarding which are officially recognized.

India, being a culturally diverse society, celebrates many holidays and festivals, but there are only three national festivals: Republic Day (26 January), Independence Day (15 August), and Gandhi Jayanti (2 October).

In India, there are more than 30 grand festivals that are celebrated in major parts of India along with other state festivals. States have local festivals depending on prevalent religious and linguistic demographics.

Popular Hindu festivals like Makar Sankranti, Pongal, Maha Shivratri, Janmashtami, Saraswati Puja, Guru Purnima, Ganesh Chaturthi, Raksha Bandhan, Holi, Durga Puja, Dussehra, and Diwali; Jain festivals like Mahavir Janma Kalyanak and Paryushan; Sikh festivals like Guru Nanak Jayanti and Vaisakhi; Muslim festivals like Eid ul-Fitr, Eid ul-Adha, Mawlid, and Muharram; Buddhist festivals like Ambedkar Jayanti, Buddha Jayanti, Dhammachakra Pravartan Day, and Losar; Parsi Zoroastrian holidays such as Nowruz; and Christian festivals like Good Friday, Christmas and Easter, some festivals are celebrated by the whole India and some festivals are celebrated by limited region of India.

National holidays

National holidays are observed in all states and union territories of India.

They are:

Other notable holidays 
States generally adopt the same holidays as the union government with some variations. In addition to the official holidays, many religious, ethnic, and other traditional holidays, as well as observances proclaimed by officials populate the calendar. At the discretion of the employer, other holidays are common additions to the list of paid holidays.

Holidays with religious significance 
In India, people from various religions coexist together. Religious and cultural holidays are characterized by a diversity of religious beliefs and practices.

Hindu holidays

Hindus celebrate several indian festivals through the year. Hindu festivals have one or more religious, cultural, and seasonal significance. The observance of the festival, the symbolisms used and attached, and the style and intensity of celebration vary from region to region within the country. A list of the more popular festivals is given below.

Islamic holidays

Sikh holidays
Several Sikh holidays are Gurpurbs, anniversaries of a guru's birth or death; marked by the holding of a festival.

Christian holidays

Buddhist holidays

Jain holidays

Parsee (Zoroastrian) holidays

The Shahenshahi and Kadmi variants of the Zoroastrian calendar do not intercalate leap years and hence the day of the Gregorian calendar year on which these days are celebrated shifts ahead with time. The third variant of the Zoroastrian calendar, known as either Fasli (in India) or Bastani (in Iran),intercalatess according to Gregorian calendar rules and thus remains synchronous with the seasons. The Parsis in India use a Shahenshahi calendar, unlike the Iranian Zoroastrians who use a Kadmi calendar. The North American and European Parsis have adapted their version of the Fasli calendar.  These differences cause changes in the dates of the holidays. For example, the Zoroastrian New Year, Nowruz, falls in the spring for the Iranians but in the summer for the Parsis.

Ravidassia holidays

Ayyavazhi holidays

Holidays in government offices
Central and State governments in India issue annually a list of holidays to be observed in the respective government offices during the year. The list is divided into two parts:
 Gazetted holidays (Annexure I)
 Restricted holidays Annexure-III)

In addition, local administrations also issue a list of holidays, known as local holidays, which are observed at the district level.

Central government
The Ministry of Personnel, Public Grievances, and Pensions (Department of Personnel and Training) on behalf of the Government of India issues a list of holidays to be observed in central government offices during the year. The list is divided into two parts i.e. Annexure I & Annexure

Annexure I
Annexure I, also known as Gazetted holidays, consists of a list of holidays that are mandatory once decided. This list consists of two parts:
 Paragraph 2
 Paragraph 3.1

Paragraph 2
It consists of holidays that are observed compulsorily across India. These holidays are:

 Republic Day
 Independence Day
 Gandhi Jayanti
 Mahavir Janma Kalyanak
 Buddha Purnima
 Christmas Day
 Dussehra
 Diwali (Deepavali)
 Good Friday
 Guru Nanak's Birthday
 Eid ul-Fitr
 Eid al-Adha (Bakrid)
 Muharram
 Prophet Muhammad's Birthday (Id-e-Milad)

Paragraph 3.1
In addition to the 14 compulsory holidays mentioned in paragraph 2, three holidays are chosen from the list below by the Central Government Employees Welfare Coordination Committee in the respective state capitals (if necessary, in consultation with Coordination Committees at other places in the State). The final list is applied uniformly across all Central Government offices within each state. They are notified after seeking the prior approval of the ministry, and no changes can be made after that. No change is permissible regarding festivals and dates.

Republic day  
 An additional day for Dussehra
 Holi
 Janamashtami (Vaishanvi)/Krishnashtami
 Rama Navami
 Maha Sivarathri
 Ganesh Chaturthi/Vinayak Chaturthi
 Makar Sankranti/Sankranthi
 Onam
 Sri Panchami/Basanta Panchami
 Vishu/Vaisakhi/Vaisakhadi/Bhag Bihu/Mashadi/Ugadi/Chaitra Sakladi/Cheti Chand/Gudhi Pada 1st Navratra/Nauraj

Annexure II
Annexure II also known as Restricted holidays, consists of a list of optional holidays. Each employee is allowed to choose any two holidays from the list of Restricted Holidays. The Coordination Committees at the State Capitals draw up a separate list of Restricted Holidays, keeping in mind the occasions of local importance, but the nine occasions left over, after choosing the three variable holidays in paragraph 3.1, are included in the list of restricted holidays.

Central government organisations
Central Government Organisations, which include industrial, commercial, and trading establishments, observe up to 16 holidays per year, including three national holidays, viz. Republic Day, Independence Day, and Mahatma Gandhi's birthday, as compulsory holidays. The remaining holidays/occasions may be determined by such establishmentsorganizationss themselves, subject to paragraph 3.2.

Union territory administrations
Union territory administrations decide the list of holidays based on Ministry of Home Affairs letter No.14046/27 /83- GP-I dated 15 February 1984, by which they observe a total of 16 holidays, including the three National Holidays, viz. Republic Day, Independence Day, and Mahatma Gandhi's birthday.

Indian missions abroad
In respect of Indian missions abroad, the number of holidays is determined in accordance with the instructions contained in the Department of Personnel and Training's O.M. No.12/5/2002-JCA dated 17 December 2002. They have the option to select 11 (eleven) holidays of their own only after including the three National Holidays and Diwali, Milad-Un-Nabi or Id-E-Milad, Mahavir Janma Kalyanak, Eid-ul-Fitr, Dussehra (Vijaya Dasami), Guru Nanak's Birthday, Christmas Day as compulsory holidays falling on weekdays.

Banks

With respect to banks, the holidays are restricted to 15 days per year in terms of the instructions issued by the Department of Economic Affairs (Banking Division).

 Bank Holiday
 Gandhi Jayanti
 Mahavir Janma Kalyanak
 Maharaja Agresen Jayanti
 Kashiram Death Anniversary
 Dussehra (Maha Navami)
 Dussehra (Vijaya Dashami)
 Dusshera (Maha Navaratri, Durgotsava, Durga Ashtami, Durga Ashtami)
 Deepawali
 Deepawali (Govardhan Puja)
 Bhai Duj/Chitragupt Jayanti
 Eid al-Adha (Bakrid)
 Guru Nanak's birthday/Kartik Poornima
 Dr. B R. Ambedkar's Nirwan Diwas
 Moharram
 Christmas
 New Year's Day
 International Women's Day
 Gudhi Padwa
 Guru Gobind Singh Ji Gurpurab
 Sankaranti
 Basanta Panchami
 Guru Ravidas Jayanti
 Chehalum
 Holi
 Easter Saturday
 Easter Monday
 Baishakhi
 Janmashtami
 Vishwakarma Pooja
 Eid ul Fitr
 Ganesh Chaturthi
 Anant chaturdasi
 Dussehra (Maha Ashtami)
 Maharshi Balmiki Jayanti
 Deepavali (Narak Chaturdasi)
 Eid ul Adha (Bakrid)
 Guru Teg Bahadur Shahid Diwas
 Moharram
 Christmas
 Second and Fourth Saturday of Every Month
 All Saturdays of the month in the IT sector

See also
 Bank holidays in India
 Indian New Year's days
 List of Hindu festivals
 List of Sikh festivals
 Islamic holidays
 List of Buddhist festivals

References

 
 

India
Holidays